, better known by her ring name , is a semi-retired Japanese professional wrestler. She came to prominence as one of the leading female wrestlers in All Japan Women's Pro-Wrestling during the 1980s. The longtime leader of the stable Gokuaku Domei — which included Crane Yu, Condor Saito and Bull Nakano — she was one of the main rivals of the popular tag team Crush Gals. Their long running feud would become extremely popular in Japan during the 1980s, with their televised matches resulting in some of the highest rated in Japanese television as well as the promotion regularly selling out arenas.

Professional wrestling career

All Japan Women's Pro-Wrestling (1980–1986)
Making her debut in 1980, within three years she defeated Lioness Asuka for the AJW Championship on January 8 and held the title for almost six months before losing the title back to Asuka on June 1, 1983.

During her feud with the Crush Gals, she would often team with Bull Nakano and Crane Yu, who Matsumoto teamed with to defeat Lioness Asuka and Chigusa Nagayo for the WWWA Tag Team title on February 25, 1985, although the two were forced to vacate the title two months later following Yu's retirement.

She later made an unsuccessful bid for the vacant WWWA World Single Championship losing to Devil Masami on December 12, 1985. She later lost to rival Chigusa Nagayo for the All Pacific Championship in Tokyo, Japan on April 5, 1986.

World Wrestling Federation (1986)
In early 1986, she and Nakano made a brief appearance in the World Wrestling Federation as The Devils of Japan, wrestling Velvet McIntyre in two separate tag team matches with Dawn Marie in Boston, Massachusetts on March 8, which they lost and with Linda Gonzales in New York City, New York on March 16, 1986, which they were victorious.

Return to AJW (1986–1988)
Once back in Japan, Matsumoto resumed her feud with the Crush Gals teaming with Bull Nakano to defeat Lioness Asuka and Kazue Nagahori (substituting for an injured Chigusa Nagayo) for the WWWA Tag Team title on August 23, 1986, however the two would eventually be forced to vacate the title the following year. Although Matsumoto officially announced her retirement on February 25, 1988, in which she wrestled the Crush Gals in a tag team match with Yukari Ohmori and then siding against her partner by switching with Nagayo against Asuka and Ohmori, she wrestled her final match against Bull Nakano and Condor Saito on February 28.

Occasional appearances (1998–present)

She has since appeared on several All Japan Women "legends reunions", and in August 1998, Matsumoto and Crane Yu came out of retirement wrestling in a ten-minute exhibition tag team match against Combat Toyoda and Hyper Cat. She also made several appearances for the now defunct GAEA promotion, and as recently as November 11, 2007, ran her own show under the banner of Gokuaku Domei Produce at Shinjuku FACE.

Other media
Matsumoto lent her ring name and likeness to the Sega  arcade game  Gokuaku Doumei Dump Matsumoto, which was released in some Western countries under the title Body Slam. The game was later ported to the Sega Master System, but Western localized versions (renamed simply Pro Wrestling) removed her likeness and replaced the entirely female cast with male wrestlers.

Since her retirement from professional wrestling, she has appeared in a number of Japanese films during the late 1980s and early 1990s most notably portraying the character Bái Yá-Shàn in Ryoichi Ikegami and Kazuo Koike's Crying Freeman series which includes Crying Freeman 2: Shades of Death, Part 1 (1989), Crying Freeman 3: Shades of Death, Part 2 (1990) and Crying Freeman 5: Abduction in Chinatown (1992). She has also starred in Scorpion Woman Prisoner: Death Threat (1991) and Okoge (1992).

Championships and accomplishments
All Japan Women's Pro-Wrestling
AJW Championship (1 time)
WWWA World Tag Team Championship (2 times) – with Crane Yu (1) and Bull Nakano (1)
Tag League the Best (1985) – with Bull Nakano
AJW Hall of Fame (1998)
Wrestling Observer Newsletter awards
Wrestling Observer Newsletter Hall of Fame (Class of 1996)

References

External links
 Dump Matsumoto by James Phillips
 
 

1960 births
Living people
Japanese female professional wrestlers
20th-century professional wrestlers